The New York City mayoral election of 1949 took place on November 8, 1949 in New York City. The candidates were incumbent Mayor William O'Dwyer, a Democrat, and former City Council President and 1945 mayoral candidate Newbold Morris, a Republican, as well as other, third-party candidates. Morris was also the nominee of the Liberal Party, and additionally ran on the City Fusion ballot line.

O'Dwyer won the contest with 48.87% of the vote.

References

Mayoral election
Mayoral elections in New York City
New York City mayoral
New York City
New York City mayoral election